Xyris montana, the northern yelloweyed grass, is a North American species of flowering plants in the yellow-eyed-grass family. It grows in eastern and central Canada (from Ontario to Newfoundland) and in the northeastern and north-central United States (from Minnesota to New England and New Jersey).

Xyris montana is a perennial herb up to 30 cm (12 inches) tall with long, narrow leaves up to 15 cm (6 inches) long but less than 3 mm (0.12 inches) wide.

References

External links
 

montana
Plants described in 1868
Flora of Canada
Flora of the Northern United States